Thành An is a rural commune of Mỏ Cày Bắc District, Bến Tre Province, Vietnam. The commune covers 11.32 km2. In 1999 it had a population of 8,106 and a population density of 716 inhabitants/km2.

References

 

Communes of Bến Tre province
Populated places in Bến Tre province